Kingmont is an unincorporated community in Marion County, West Virginia, United States. Kingmont has a post office with ZIP code 26578.

References

Unincorporated communities in Marion County, West Virginia
Unincorporated communities in West Virginia
Coal towns in West Virginia